H.E.R.B.I.E. (Humanoid Experimental Robot, B-type, Integrated Electronics) is a fictional robot appearing in American comic books published by Marvel Comics. The character was initially conceived for The New Fantastic Four and integrated into the comics continuity shortly afterwards. The character is usually depicted as an ally of the Fantastic Four.

Creation and conception
When the Fantastic Four property was made into an animated series in 1978, the character of the Human Torch was unable to be used as, at the time, the character had been optioned separately for use in a solo movie (which never materialized).
A popular urban myth contends that the Torch was replaced due to fears that children might attempt to emulate him by setting themselves on fire, but that is not true.

Needing a fourth member to round out the team, Stan Lee pitched the idea for a cute robot sidekick and artist Dave Cockrum was commissioned to design it. However, Cockrum disliked the character so much he was eventually replaced by Jack Kirby, who first designed and illustrated the Fantastic Four a decade prior. This was Kirby's last work for Marvel.

On the Fantastic Four cartoon, H.E.R.B.I.E. was voiced by Frank Welker. Shortly after the cartoon premiered, the little robot was introduced to the comics continuity by writer Marv Wolfman and artist John Byrne. As within the Marvel Universe, the Fantastic Four in the cartoon have marketed their likenesses for a successful in-universe comic series. H.E.R.B.I.E.'s physical appearance was likewise explained as being based on the animated series based on that comic, with the in-universe explanation for H.E.R.B.I.E. being on the team that the Torch was absent when the rest of the team signed the contracts granting permission for their likenesses to be used.

Publication history
H.E.R.B.I.E. first appeared in comics in Fantastic Four #209 (August 1979), and was adapted from the cartoon character by Marv Wolfman and John Byrne.

The character subsequently appears in Fantastic Four #210-213 (September–December 1979), #215-217 (February–April 1980), #242 (May 1982), #244 (July 1982), Fantastic Four #3 (March 1998), Marvel Holiday Special (2004), Exiles #72 (January 2006), Fantastic Four #534 (March 2006), X-Men #181 (March 2006), Franklin Richards One Shot (April 2006), X-Men/Runaways #1 (May 2006), The Sensational Spider-Man #25 (June 2006), Fantastic Four: A Death in the Family (July 2006), Franklin Richards: Super Summer Spectacular (September 2006), Franklin Richards: Happy Franksgiving! (January 2007), Franklin Richards: Monster Mash (November 2007), Franklin Richards: Fall Football Fiasco! (January 2008).

H.E.R.B.I.E. received an entry in the All-New Official Handbook of the Marvel Universe A-Z #5 (2006).

He also appeared in All-New, All-Different Black Knight #1 in 2015. He appears as a part of the Black Knight’s sanctuary.

Fictional character biography
H.E.R.B.I.E. was created by Mister Fantastic and Master Xar of the Xandarians, who hoped that the robot could aid their search for Galactus, whom they sought for aid in defeating the villain known as the Sphinx.

What neither of the creators realized, however, was that Doctor Sun, an enemy of Master Xar who had his consciousness trapped within Xandarian computers, was able to escape by jumping from the computer to H.E.R.B.I.E.'s body. The little robot was his sleeper agent, whom he could control whenever he wished. Although an alien pirate mysteriously died in H.E.R.B.I.E.'s presence, and the villain Blastaar suddenly escaped from the Negative Zone, nobody suspects that H.E.R.B.I.E. was responsible.

After Sun's attempt to assassinate the Fantastic Four with Blastaar failed, Dr. Sun reveals himself at last, trapping the Invisible Woman and the Human Torch within the Baxter Building's security system and besting Mister Fantastic and Thing with H.E.R.B.I.E.'s weapons. He then abandons H.E.R.B.I.E.'s body and transfers his consciousness into the Baxter Building's main computer, which would allow him to control the entire building, and all of the weaponry within. Mister Fantastic is able to lock Dr. Sun away from the rest of the computer system, but H.E.R.B.I.E., now himself again, realizes that Dr. Sun could always simply return to his body. Not wanting the villain to cause any more trouble, the little robot heroically throws himself into the computer, destroying it, Dr. Sun, and himself.

Later, Franklin is shown with another H.E.R.B.I.E robot, that Ben refers to as a 'flying frog'. It is explained that this one had been built partly to keep an eye on Franklin's developing powers. Said powers fluctuate due to Franklin's failure to solve a Rubik's Cube and a nearby TV show urging someone to 'grow up'. The resulting power surge destroys H.E.R.B.I.E.

Other H.E.R.B.I.E. robots are eventually built throughout the years, serving general duties around the Baxter Building. In Marvel Knights Fantastic Four, H.E.R.B.I.E. has served as the guardian and companion for young Franklin Richards and his sister Valeria.

A mistake leaves the Fantastic Four lost in time and other heroes running the Baxter Building. The H.E.R.B.I.E. robots take on the costumes of Doctor Doom and demand respect. Otherwise they are peaceful. They later reject this clothing and go back to normal duties. Several of the robots take to watching interesting videos online in their downtime.

The design of H.E.R.B.I.E. is displayed in the Smithsonian, near the Spider-Mobile.

After Reed Richards and his wife vanish following the "Secret Wars" storyline, much of Reed's belongings are transferred over to the heroine known as Moon Girl. H.E.R.B.I.E. activates when Galactus shows up. H.E.R.B.I.E. declares he has been a Galactus sensing device all this time. It's also revealed that in the comic book continuity, Johnny Storm did not show up to a meeting with a cartoon company, therefore H.E.R.B.I.E. replaced him in a cartoon series based on the Fantastic Four.

H.E.R.B.I.E. is among the former Fantastic Four members that were summoned to Mister Fantastic and Invisible Woman when they were threatened by the Griever at the End of All Things.

In the one-shot Incoming!, Valeria Von Doom removes H.E.R.B.I.E.'s inhibitor chip and language censor, allowing him to finally express to Mister Fantastic and Invisible Woman how much he hates them.

During the "Iron Man 2020" event, H.E.R.B.I.E. appears as a member of the A.I. Army. He and Quasimodo raid a Futura Motors testing site and use an un-hibitor to free the robotic crash test dummies. They are attacked by Iron Man whose attack destroys the un-hibitor. H.E.R.B.I.E., Quasimodo, and the robot test dummies then flee the area. During the raid, Arno Stark sent out a signal to keep the A.I. Army from escaping to the Thirteenth Floor. H.E.R.B.I.E. reports to the rest of the A.I. Army that Quasimodo is deactivated and Mark One is facing off against Iron Man. He runs into Awesome Android who is carrying a tablet that Machinesmith transferred his consciousness into as they flee the Baintronics guards. As Iron Man tries to reason with Mark, H.E.R.B.I.E. finds the rocket launcher that Machine Man was supposed to use and fires it on Iron Man. As Awesome Android is carrying Mark One's body, H.E.R.B.I.E. states to Machinesmith that they have to flee. The three of them are contacted by Ghost in the Machine who states that they have not yet won the war and to get Mark One's body away from the battle. When Iron Man begins to descend on them, Machinesmith has Awesome Android mimic Iron Man's appearance and provide them with an escape underground. In New Jersey, Machinesmith, H.E.R.B.I.E., and Awesome Android have made use of a temporary lair as Machinesmith places his consciousness into another body. Machine Man, Jocasta, and Dr. Bhang contact them stating that they found a way to block the obedience code. H.E.R.B.I.E., Awesome Android, and Machinesmith accompany Rescue in the raid on Baintronics. After Tony Stark gets a new body, H.E.R.B.I.E. asks how they can get up to the Stark Space Station. Tony states that he knows a way. Once that is done, H.E.R.B.I.E. is among those that confront Arno until the Extinction Entity arrives. As everyone partakes in the fight against the Extinction Entity, H.E.R.B.I.E. is among those defeated. It turns out that the Extinction Entity was just a simulation and was the result of the disease that Arno thought he cured himself of.

Related robots

H.U.B.E.R.T.
Short for Hyper-Ultronic Brain Employing Randomized Tracings, H.U.B.E.R.T. was created by Mister Fantastic to be Franklin's babysitter making him the successor of Agatha Harkness. The original H.U.B.E.R.T is destroyed by Franklin with his powers, but Richards builds a second H.U.B.E.R.T.

S.H.E.R.B.I.E.
Short for S.H.I.E.L.D. Heuristic Experimental Robot, B-Type, Integrated Electronics, S.H.E.R.B.I.E. is a robot who is S.H.I.E.L.D.'s version of H.E.R.B.I.E.

Other versions

Deadpool: Killustrated
In an alternate universe devoid of heroes, Deadpool uses modified H.E.R.B.I.E. units to murder his allies, supervillains who have pointed the way to murdering all fictional beings. The units offer backrubs but instead use sawblades.

Franklin Richards: Son of a Genius
In the humorous, out-of-continuity series Franklin Richards: Son of a Genius, H.E.R.B.I.E. is portrayed as the fully intelligent and beleaguered nanny of a mischievous, Calvin-esque Franklin Richards, and is forced to aid Franklin in stopping/cleaning up after any number of fiascoes caused by Franklin's use without permission of his father's (Mister Fantastic) hi-tech inventions.  Though this H.E.R.B.I.E. can be high-strung and even neurotic at times it is also capable of level-headed thought and quick action in an emergency; H.E.R.B.I.E.'s efforts are often all that keep Franklin from punishment for abusing his father's equipment.

Marvel Adventures Power Pack
In the retelling of the Power Pack origins, set in the Marvel Adventures continuum, H.E.R.B.I.E. is portrayed in a role similar to his Son of a Genius one, acting essentially as a nanny and a "big brother" friend to Franklin and his superpowered friends. He harbors an unrequited crush for Friday, the sentient ship acting as the "guardian" of the Power Pack, coming to help Franklin in saving the Power Pack by Skrull impostors only to have an excuse to see "her" again.

Marvel Mangaverse
In this continuity, H.E.R.B.I.E. is the entirety of the security system for the Baxter Building. It has small, familiar flying units as extensions of its computer core. The Watcher activates it as a way to gain the team's attention.

Marvel Zombies
In the alternate universe of Marvel Zombies, specifically in Marvel Zombies 2, a handful of active H.E.R.B.I.E. robots show up as security for the Baxter Building, even though the Fantastic Four have left it empty and abandoned for some time. It is later explained that Forge, one of the few mutant survivors, activated H.E.R.B.I.E.

Old Man Quill

A H.E.R.B.I.E. unit survives in the wreckage of the Baxter Building for fifty-five years. This is part of a planned loop by Peter Quill of the future era, in order to gain equipment and time needed to save innocent lives. H.E.R.B.I.E.'s interactions with the past and the future, including himself, allow Peter's plan to succeed, removing various threats from both time periods.

Ultimate Marvel
In the setting of Marvel's Ultimate comics, versions of H.E.R.B.I.E. appear as a numbered series of small, hovering helper robots in the series, as well as a few oversized mech-like guard drones.

In other media

Television
 H.E.R.B.I.E. appeared as a core member in The New Fantastic Four, voiced by Frank Welker.
 H.E.R.B.I.E. appears in Fantastic Four: World's Greatest Heroes, voiced by Sam Vincent. This version is a supercomputer that monitors Mister Fantastic's lab.
 H.E.R.B.I.E. appears in The Super Hero Squad Show, voiced by Tara Strong. He first appears in "If This Be My Thanos!", helping Falcon defend the Baxter Building from Abomination, MODOK, and Paste-Pot Pete. H.E.R.B.I.E. is featured as a supporting character in season two. In the episode "Double Negation at the World's End", he and Wolverine are having an off-screen conversation, discussing how he the F4, and Wolverine says he heard it was because "they thought it was because kids would try to imitate the Human Torch", with this being dismissed as an urban legend.
 H.E.R.B.I.E. makes a brief appearance in The Avengers: Earth's Mightiest Heroes episode "The Kang Dynasty". He is seen with Hank Pym, Mister Fantastic, and other geniuses trying to prevent Ravonna from fading out completely.
 H.E.R.B.I.E. makes a brief appearance in the Ultimate Spider-Man episode "Venom".

Film
 A deactivated H.E.R.B.I.E. makes a cameo in the extended cut of the 2005 Fantastic Four film.

Video games
 H.E.R.B.I.E. appears in Marvel Heroes.
 H.E.R.B.I.E appeared in the virtual pinball game Fantastic Four for Pinball FX 2 released by Zen Studios.
 H.E.R.B.I.E. is a playable character in Lego Marvel Super Heroes, voiced by Tara Strong.

Spoofs
 H.E.R.B.I.E. is parodied in The Venture Bros. as "H.E.L.P.eR." (a creation of Dr. Jonas Venture Sr.) and "H.U.G.G.I.E." (a much larger and imposing, but still friendly creation of Mr. Fantastic parody Professor Impossible).

References

External links
 H.E.R.B.I.E. at Marvel.

Comics characters introduced in 1979
Characters created by Jack Kirby
Characters created by Stan Lee
Fantastic Four
Fictional artificial intelligences
Marvel Comics robots